The Chichiri Museum, also known as the Museum of Malawi, is a historical and cultural museum located in Blantyre, Malawi. Strictly Museum of Malawi refers to a group of five museums but Chichiri Museum (which is one of them) uses the name due to the breadth of its exhibits.

History
The Society of Malawi started to campaign for a museum in the early 1950s. The Museums of Malawi, initially known as the Nyasaland Museum, was established through legislation in May 1957 via Museum Ordinance No. 201. The initial museum was housed at Mandala house in Blantyre.  

The current museum building was constructed in 1965 at Chichiri Hill in Blantyre, using funds from the Beit Trust and the Government of Malawi. The cost of construction was 21,000 Malawian pounds. The museum was formally opened by Kamuzu Banda on 29 June 1966.  Under the presidency of Kamuzu Band collecting was in some cases limited to avoid any risk of upsetting the government with the result that little collecting was done from groups associated with rebels. Attempts to compensate for this have been made in post Banda collecting practices.

In 2009 the Electricity Supply Corporation of Malawi supplied a hydroelectic exhibit that sits in the outdoor section of the museum.

Collection

The museum has a transport collection displayed outdoors that includes a steam engine, a fire engine and a Europeans only bus. Also outdoors is a Ndiwula hut in the syle of a Chewa rural homestead. It was built in 1966 under the instructions of President Kamuzu Banda.

The museum also displays the Machinga Meteorite which at the time of its fall was mistaken for a mozambique missile. The meteorite weighs 93.2Kg and in 1984 was classified as a shocked L6c chondrite. In 1990 a reanalysis classified it as a L6d.

Gallery

References

External links

 

1957 establishments in Nyasaland
Museums established in 1966
Museums in Malawi
National museums
Buildings and structures in Southern Region, Malawi
Buildings and structures in Blantyre